Colobochyla salicalis, the European lesser belle or lesser belle, is a species of moth of the family Erebidae. It is found  over almost all of the Palearctic.

Technical description and variation

C. salicalis Schiff. (71 b). Forewing pale fuscous finely dusted with whitish, so as to appear grey; lines ferruginous edged with pale ochreous; the inner straight, the outer and subterminal somewhat curved inwards, the latter running into apex; hindwing pale fuscous, darker terminally, showing a faint subterminal line.; the forms occurring in [ Amurland and Japan] are greyer or paler  that in Japan, —ab. cinerea Btlr., — greyer than the type; while the Amurland form — ab. laetalis Stgr. — is not only much paler but slightly smaller. Larva green, with the segmental incisions yellowish; the head
also green; spiracles black. The wingspan is 26–30 mm.

Biology

Adults are on wing from May to July. There is one generation per year.

The larvae feed on the young shoots and leaves of Populus tremula.

References

External links

Lesser Belle on UKmoths
Fauna Europaea
Lepiforum.de

Boletobiinae
Moths of Japan
Moths of Europe
Moths of Asia
Taxa named by Michael Denis
Taxa named by Ignaz Schiffermüller